Đurađ is a Serbian masculine given name, derived from the Greek Georgios. It is also transliterated as Djuradj.

It is, along with the variant Đorđe, the equivalent of the English George. It was widespread in medieval Serbia, being the name of many noblemen and magnates.

It may refer to:

 Đurađ I Balšić ( 1362–78), Lord of Zeta
 Đurađ II Balšić (1385–1403), Lord of Zeta
 Đurađ Bogutović ( 1370–99), Serbian nobleman
 Đurađ Branković (1377–1456), Serbian Despot
 Đurađ Đurašević ( 1413–35), Serbian nobleman
 Đurađ Crnojević ( 1489–1514), Lord of Zeta
 Đurađ Bošković (1904–1990), Serbian art historian
 Đurađ Vasić (born 1956), Serbian football coach and former player
 Đurađ Jakšić (born 1977), Serbian politician
 Đurađ Dobrijević (born 1995), Serbian footballer

See also
 Đura, diminutive
 Đuro, diminutive
 Đurđe, given name
 Đurđević
 Sveti Đurađ, placename

References

Further reading
 

Serbian masculine given names